East Sixth Avenue Parkway is a parkway, part of the Denver Park and Parkway System, which was built in 1909.  It was listed on the National Register of Historic Places in 1986.

It runs from Colorado Blvd. to Quebec St. in the Hale and Montclair neighborhoods of Denver, Colorado.

The listing included two contributing structures.

References

National Register of Historic Places in Denver
Buildings and structures completed in 1909